The University of Chemistry and Technology, Prague (UCT Prague; , VŠCHT Praha) is the largest university specializing in chemistry in the Czech Republic. Though founded in 1952, UCT Prague has origins dating back to the early nineteenth century and Prague Polytechnic, a precursor to the present-day Czech Technical University in Prague, and, since that time, it has been one of the leading chemistry research universities in Central Europe. More than 3,600 students are accepted every year. In 2014, UCT Prague had 510 academic staff and 361 research staff.

Faculties
The university has four faculties.

Faculty of Chemical Technology
The Faculty of Chemical Technology was established in 1969 as a result of the merger between the Faculty of Inorganic Technology and the Faculty of Organic Technology. In 1952, these faculties, together with the Faculty of Food Technology, founded the independent Institute of Chemical Technology (now: UCT Prague).

Faculty of Environmental Technology
The Faculty of Environmental Technology was established in 1953, but activities in this area date back to the mid-1880s. In the 1980s, environmental technology became predominant in the faculty's activities, and in 1991, it acquired its current name.

Faculty of Food and Biochemical Technology
The teaching of food chemistry and technology has a long-standing tradition in the Czech lands, and is closely connected with the teaching of chemistry and chemical technology. The Faculty of Food and Biochemical Technology was established in 1952.

Faculty of Chemical Engineering
The Faculty of Chemical Engineering originated in the Prague School of Chemical-Technological Engineering founded in 1952 as part of the Czech Technical University. In 1960, the faculty was established in response to meet the needs of the chemical industry.

History

Origins

The history of the university is rooted in the chemistry education in Bohemia from past centuries. Rapid industrial development during the eighteenth century, which is connected to many important technological and natural discoveries, resulted in the foundation of Prague Polytechnic on 10 November 1806, when the first courses in mathematics and chemistry were offered. In addition to general chemistry, practical chemistry instruction was also given, oriented towards working with glass, metallurgy and dyes. Later, brewing processes, sugar processes, analytics, analytics of minerals and technical gases, and other subject fields were added.

After the reorganization of Prague Polytechnic in 1920, the School of Chemical Technology was formed as one of seven sections of the Czech Technical University in Prague. The school's reputation at the end of nineteenth century was very high, and professor Emil Votoček (1872-1950) improved its excellent international reputation into the early twentieth century. The highest awards for university students and exceptional personalities in Czech chemistry carry his name.

Present university
The present university was formed in 1952 when it became independent of the Czech Technical University in Prague.

People

Professors
 Otto Wichterle, inventor of the modern contact lens (1936-1970)
 Emil Votoček (1872-1950)

References

External links
 Official University Website

 
Universities in the Czech Republic
Educational institutions in Prague
Educational institutions established in 1952
1952 establishments in Czechoslovakia